William Smith (June 26, 1840) was an American politician from the state of South Carolina. He served two terms as a Senator in the United States Senate, the first from 1816 to 1823 and the second from 1826 to 1831. During his life Smith was one of the most prominent political leaders in the state of South Carolina. He formed an intense rivalry with John C. Calhoun, arguing against Calhoun's nationalist views, and advocating for states' rights.

Biography

Early life and career 
Smith was born  in either North Carolina or York County, South Carolina. Not much is known about his early life outside of his education. He first attended a school named Bullock's Creek, where he befriended classmates Andrew Jackson and William H. Crawford. Then, he attended Mt. Zion College in Winnsboro, South Carolina, which was the first preparatory school in the region. He once stated to a friend stated that his life could be described as "wild, reckless, intemperate, rude and boisterous, yet resolute and determined." To that same friend he also credited all of his success to a promise he once made to his wife, Margaret Duff, to forego alcohol.

Smith's law career began on January 6, 1784 when he was admitted to the bar. In one notable case, his client who had been charged for killing a horse failed to appear before the court. Smith did not see the man for a number of years until he ran into him in the Hall of the House of Representatives. The man, known to Smith by the surname "Elchinor", now went by the name John Alexander and was a Representative for the state of Ohio. Smith ensured that Representative Alexander paid him for his previous services.

Political career 
Smith became a member of the South Carolina Senate in the early 1800s and ended his career in that body as Senate President. In 1808 he became a judge. As a jurist his temperament was considered "tyranical but fair." Then In 1816, Smith was elected a United States Senator, after defeating Charles D. Pringle for the seat. Shortly after taking office, Smith began a political feud with John C. Calhoun which would last the duration of his political career in South Carolina.

The feud between Calhoun and Smith resided in their different political philosophies, when Smith joined the Senate, Calhoun was still a nationalist who believed in internal infrastructure improvements and a "broad construction" of the Constitution, two concepts which Smith found repugnant. In response to Calhoun's growing popularity, Smith formed a coalition of States' Rights allies which included Thomas Cooper, Stephen Decatur Miller, Josiah J. Evans, and David Rogerson Williams. The South Carolina nationalists led by Calhoun "favored a few national roads because of national military necessity", they repudiated small-scale local appropriations. But, to the Smith faction, even roads for purported military use would instead be used to bolster the economy of other states. This concept of South Carolina in competition with the nation for economic prosperity was common at the time in the South Carolina elite.

A member of the planter class, Smith owned several plantations and at least 71 slaves. Smith was one of the first Southerners to argue, at the time of the Missouri Compromise in 1820, that American slavery was a "positive good", arguing that the enslaved were "so domesticated, or so kindly treated by their masters, and their situations so improved" that few would express discontent with their condition. In 1828, seven electors from Georgia chose him for vice president, instead of Calhoun, the Democratic nominee. He was also a  splinter candidate for vice president in 1836: Virginia refused to accept Richard Mentor Johnson as the Democratic vice presidential candidate, and voted for the ticket of Martin Van Buren and William Smith, putting Johnson one electoral vote short of a majority; the Senate went on to elect Johnson.

In 1832, he moved to Louisiana, having lost his political base in South Carolina. In 1836, he moved on to Huntsville, Alabama, and was elected to the Alabama House of Representatives for Madison County from August 1, 1836, holding that seat for the rest of his life.

On March 3, 1837, outgoing President Andrew Jackson nominated Smith to the Supreme Court. Five days later, the newly seated Senate of the 25th Congress confirmed Smith's nomination by a vote of 23–18. However, Smith declined the appointment and did not serve.

References

External links

|-

|-

|-

|-

|-

1762 births
1840 deaths
Democratic Party (United States) vice presidential nominees
Democratic-Republican Party United States senators
Democratic Party United States senators from South Carolina
Members of the Alabama House of Representatives
Democratic Party members of the South Carolina House of Representatives
Democratic Party South Carolina state senators
South Carolina lawyers
South Carolina Democratic-Republicans
1828 United States vice-presidential candidates
1836 United States vice-presidential candidates
Unsuccessful nominees to the United States Supreme Court
19th-century American lawyers
19th-century American judges
19th-century American politicians
American proslavery activists
American slave owners